Robert James Watson (February 23, 1846 – October 16, 1931) was a Canadian politician.

Born in Saint John, New Brunswick, he was educated at a Public School and Hamilton University. A farmer, he ran unsuccessfully in the Ontario riding of Muskoka and Parry Sound for the House of Commons of Canada in 1900. He was elected in the 1904 election for the riding of Parry Sound. A Liberal, he was defeated in 1908.

A Presbyterian, he married Carrie Schoby on April 23, 1878.

References
 The Canadian Parliament; biographical sketches and photo-engravures of the senators and members of the House of Commons of Canada. Being the tenth Parliament, elected November 3, 1904

External links
 

1846 births
1931 deaths
Canadian Presbyterians
Liberal Party of Canada MPs
Members of the House of Commons of Canada from Ontario